Garden Village may refer to the following places:

Garden Village, Kentucky
Garden Village, a housing estate in Micklefield, Leeds, England
Garden Village, Ontario, Canada
Garden Village, Swansea, Wales
Garden Village A.F.C.
Garden Village, Wrexham, Wales
Garden Village, a suburb in Somerset West, South Africa
The Garden Village, Kingston upon Hull

See also 
Alverstone Garden Village
Alkrington Garden Village
Garden City (disambiguation) – includes Garden Suburb
Garden city movement